Metodi Zarev (born 8 May 1945) is a Bulgarian wrestler. He competed in the men's Greco-Roman 78 kg at the 1968 Summer Olympics.

References

External links
 

1945 births
Living people
Bulgarian male sport wrestlers
Olympic wrestlers of Bulgaria
Wrestlers at the 1968 Summer Olympics
Sportspeople from Sofia